Jervine is a steroidal alkaloid with molecular formula C27H39NO3 which is derived from the plant genus Veratrum. Similar to cyclopamine, which also occurs in the genus Veratrum, it is a teratogen implicated in birth defects when consumed by animals during a certain period of their gestation.

Physiological effects 
Jervine is a potent teratogen causing birth defects in vertebrates. In severe cases it can cause cyclopia and holoprosencephaly.

Mechanism of action 
Jervine's biological activity is mediated via its interaction with the 7 pass trans membrane protein smoothened.  Jervine binds with and inhibits smoothened, which is an integral part of the hedgehog signaling pathways. With smoothened inhibited, the GLI1 transcription cannot be activated and hedgehog target genes cannot be transcribed.

References 

Teratogens
Jervines
Spiro compounds
Secondary alcohols
Ketones
Oxygen heterocycles
Nitrogen heterocycles
Plant toxins